Nenci is a surname. Notable people with the surname include:

Francesco Nenci (1781–1850), Italian painter
Franco Nenci (1935–2020), Italian boxer

See also
Nanci

Italian-language surnames